Discovery Channel Hungary is a Hungarian television channel.

Discovery Channel began broadcasting to Hungary in 1997. The Hungarian version was launched on March 1, 2005. Advertising sales are handled by a R-Time, which is owned by RTL Klub.

Along with the other Discovery channels in Central Europe, Discovery Hungary adopted the new Discovery logo on July 1, 2009.

The Attraktor, the first Hungarian-made programme on the channel, was first shown on November 14, 2014 in the Czech Republic, Hungary and Romania. The show had been formerly aired on the news website Index.hu which now produces the series.

References

Hungary
Television networks in Hungary
Television channels and stations established in 2005
Warner Bros. Discovery EMEA